Ernest Robert "Hank" Staveneau (February 6, 1893 – July 22, 1949) was a Canadian professional ice hockey player. He played with the Ottawa Senators of the National Hockey Association during the 1915–16 and 1916–17 seasons.

References

1893 births
1949 deaths
Canadian ice hockey right wingers
Ice hockey people from Ontario
Ottawa Senators (NHA) players
People from Arnprior, Ontario